Ratnakar is an Indian name derived from Sanskrit Ratna.

 Ratnakar Hari Kelkar (1904–1985), reviser and translator of the Bible
 Ratnakar Matkari (born 1938), Marathi writer
 Ratnakar Pai (1928–2009), Hindustani classical music vocalist of the Jaipur-Atrauli Gharana
Ratnakar Pandey, a politician from India
 Ratnakar Bank, a scheduled commercial bank in Maharashtra
 Dashyu Ratnakar, a 1962 Ollywood/Oriya film directed by Prabhat Mukherjee Dasyu Ratnakar
 Ratnakar (2019 film), a 2019 Assamese-language film by Jatin Bora

Indian given names